The trinomial triangle is a variation of Pascal's triangle. The difference between the two is that an entry in the trinomial triangle is the sum of the three (rather than the two in Pascal's triangle) entries above it:

The -th entry of the -th row is denoted by

 .

Rows are counted starting from 0. The symmetry of the entries of a row about the middle entry is expressed by the relationship

Properties 

The -th row corresponds to the coefficients in the polynomial expansion of the expansion of the trinomial  raised to the -th power:

or, symmetrically,
,
hence the alternative name trinomial coefficients because of their relationship to the multinomial coefficients:

 

Furthermore, the diagonals have interesting properties, such as their relationship to the triangular numbers.

Recurrence formula 

The trinomial coefficients can be generated using the following recurrence formula:

,

Central trinomial coefficients 

The middle entries of the trinomial triangle
 1, 1, 3, 7, 19, 51, 141, 393, 1107, 3139, … 
were studied by Euler and are known as central trinomial coefficients.

The -th central trinomial coefficient is given by
 
Their generating function is
 

Euler noted the following exemplum memorabile inductionis fallacis ("notable example of fallacious induction"):
where  is the n-th Fibonacci number. For larger , however, this relationship is incorrect. George Andrews explained this fallacy using the general identity

Applications

In chess 

The triangle corresponds to the number of possible paths that can be taken by the king in a game of chess. The entry in a cell represents the number of different paths (using a minimum number of moves) the king can take to reach the cell.

In combinatorics 
For example, from two sets of the three cards A, B, C, the different drawings are:

For example,
.

In particular, this provides the formula  for the number of different hands in the card game Doppelkopf.

Alternatively, it is also possible to arrive at this expression by considering the number of ways of choosing  pairs of identical cards from the two sets, which is the binomial coefficient . The remaining  cards can then be chosen in  ways, which can be written in terms of the binomial coefficients as
.
The example above corresponds to the three ways of selecting two cards without pairs of identical cards (AB, AC, BC) and the three ways of selecting a pair of identical cards (AA, BB, CC).

References

Further reading 

 

Discrete mathematics
Triangles of numbers
Factorial and binomial topics